Yasemin Çongar (born 22 December 1966) is a Turkish journalist, writer, and translator.

Life 
She started journalism in 1984 at ANKA News Agency . She graduated from Ankara University and Georgetown University.

She wrote for the journals, Tomorrow and Science and Art , which were associated to the Workers Party of Turkey. She was on the team that brought out Tomorrow. During this period, she was tried and acquitted on the charge of "propagandizing for communism".

She worked as a diplomatic reporter at ANKA. Later, she worked at the newspaper Cumhuriyet , which was under the direction of Hasan Cemal .

In the early 1990s and, she went to London started working at the BBC. After returning to Turkey from London, she worked as a manager in the Strategy-Mori research company in Istanbul. Later, she left and joined the staff that prepared the Yeni Yüzyıl newspaper.

She became the Washington correspondent and columnist of Milliyet . She worked as a journalist in Washington between 1995-2007.  In 2007, her long interviews were published with novelists such as Orhan Pamuk , Paul Auster and Salman Rushdi . It came to the fore with the news of the Hudson incident in 2007. Çongar, was the Washington representative of CNN Türk , and presented a monthly program called "This is Washington", since 2006. She left Milliyet and CNN Türk in 2007, She worked for the newspaper Taraf'',   for five years as Deputy Editor-in-Chief and columnist. She wrote articles on the political agenda in his column called "Ya Da" and essays in her column "Ex Libris".

In 2008, she participated in the I Apologize campaign.

On 14 December 2012, he resigned from his position at the newspaper Taraf , together with Ahmet Altan. Çongar founded the Punto24 Independent Journalism Platform with Hasan Cemal, Doğan Akın and Yavuz Baydar in 2013.  She has essays "What We Loved, What We Left Unfinished", "It's Dangerous and Permissible to Engage in Construction", "Revolt and Gravity" and a review book called "No Secrets Anymore".

Her work appeared in Al-Monitor.

In 2022, she was convicted of "exposing state secrets."

Translated works 

 Ahmet Altan I Will Never See the World Again

References

External links 

 Interview with Yasemin Çongar 2019
1966 births
Turkish journalists
Living people